Lavaş cheese is a distinctive variety of cheese traditionally produced in Karacadağ, in the vicinity of Diyarbakır in Turkey. It is generally made from sheep's milk.

References

Middle Eastern cheeses
Turkish cuisine
Sheep's-milk cheeses
Turkish cheeses